Their Quiet Honeymoon is a 1915 silent film short directed by Al Christie. It starred Eddie Lyons, Lee Moran, and Betty Compson. It was produced by the Nestor Film Company and distribute through Universal Film Manufacturing Company.

Cast
Eddie Lyons - Eddie
Betty Compson - Betty
Lee Moran - Lee
Jane Waller - Jane

See also
Betty Compson filmography

References

External links
 Their Quiet Honeymoon at IMDb.com

1915 films
American silent short films
American black-and-white films
Films directed by Al Christie
Universal Pictures short films
1910s American films